Paul Maurice Zoll (July 15, 1911 – January 5, 1999) was a Jewish American cardiologist and one of the pioneers in the development of the artificial cardiac pacemaker and cardiac defibrillator. He graduated from Boston Latin School in 1928.

Introduction
Paul Maurice Zoll succeeded in preventing life-threatening disturbances of heart rhythm and in restoring effective heart action to victims about to die from sudden cardiac arrest. He accomplished these feats with the application of indirect and direct electrical shocks that restored a life sustaining heart rhythm. Because of his methods, he has been called "The Father of Modern Cardiac Therapy". Still today there is an annual toll of approximately 450,000 sudden arrhythmic deaths in the USA alone.
Paul Zoll was a pioneer with a panoramic wide-angle view of his patients’ needs gleaned from his office and bedside hospital practice. During his career, Paul Zoll equally divided his time between clinical care and research in his laboratory. His first in the world milestones resulted in paradigm shifts in cardiac care. Each conformed to the scientific "gold" standards with well documented detailed published data of laboratory experiments and results in patients that were replicated by independent investigators.
Among those milestones are chest surface pacing of an arrested heart in 1952; clinical alarmed heart rhythm monitors in 1953; chest surface electrical shock ("defibrillation") to terminate life-threatening ventricular fibrillation in 1956; installation of a Zoll-Belgard- Electrodyne self-contained long term pacemaker in a child in 1960; and the introduction of a new concept that permitted "painless" chest surface pacing in 1982. The new device launched a small company that grew to be known as the Zoll Medical Corporation.

Paul Zoll developed methods of applying electric shocks to the surface of the chest that stimulated the heart within. When the heart of his first clinical success ceased to beat because its native stimulus signal failed, Zoll saved the man by substituting a sequence of chest shocks produced by an experimental pacemaker borrowed from Otto Krayer of the Harvard Medical School Department of Physiology. The next year he collaborated with Alan Belgard, the chief electrical engineer and co-owner of the Electrodyne Company, to develop an efficient chest surface pacemaker to conform to Paul's needs. That collaboration became long-term as together they developed production model chest surface pacemakers, clinical alarmed heart rhythm monitors, chest surface defibrillators, cardiac monitor- automatic pacemakers, and long-term implantable self-contained pacemakers.

Youth and education
Zoll's parents met in the US after emigrating from Eastern Europe. Hyman's roots were in Lithuania and Mollie's in Belarus. They settled in the Boston district of Roxbury, Massachusetts. Hyman worked with his father and brother in the family leather business. Mollie, in addition to being a homemaker, worked in her one-room home office electrolysis treatment center. The couple was Jewish and devoutly observant of their religion's customs and rituals. They were parents of two boys. The first, Herbert, was followed four years later by Paul. Both attended religious school and at the age of thirteen had a Bar Mitzvah rite of passage to celebrate their transition to manhood in the Jewish community.

Paul followed Herbert to Boston Latin School and Harvard College. Herbert graduated in 1932 with hopes of becoming an English teacher in the Boston Public School System. At Harvard, Paul majored in psychology with aspirations of remaining in academics. Because Herbert could not secure a teaching position, Mollie feared that Paul would suffer the same fate and advised that he pursue a career in medicine. (Herbert eventually did secure a position and rose in the ranks to become chairman of the language department at Boston Latin School.)

Paul graduated Harvard College Summa Cum Laude in 1932 and entered Harvard Medical School (HMS). Because of high academic standing, he was able to spend a portion of his senior year engaged in cardiac research with Soma Weiss, the venerated mentor of students at the medical school.

Paul was shaken during his last year of medical school by the death of his mother, Mollie, at the age of 49. That event had lasting personal repercussions. Mollie was believed to suffer from rheumatic heart disease and perhaps from underlying congenital heart disease. On several occasions, Mollie requested that a post mortem autopsy be performed to clarify the cause when she died and to help others. Paul's father, Hyman, disregarded his wife's wishes and Paul's arguments on the grounds that autopsy was a religious prohibition. Paul dissociated himself from his religious roots and never returned.

After graduation in 1936, Paul interned at Beth Israel Hospital—a major teaching hospital of HMS. He then completed a one-year medical residency at New York Bellevue Hospital and returned to Beth Israel Hospital as a Macy Research Fellow to study the pathophysiology of coronary disease. After settling in at his new position, he married Janet Jones, who he met while training at Bellevue.

Military service
Home life and work were interrupted by World War Two. Paul served as an army physician from 1941 to 1946. He was deployed to the Aleutians and then to England, where he became Chief of Medicine at the 160th General Hospital that was designated for wounded military evacuees with chest injuries. Paul and Dwight Harken, a HMS classmate and brilliant chest surgeon, removed bullets and shrapnel from in and around the hearts and great vessels of 138 soldiers without a fatality.

Commitment
After the war, Paul resumed his research work with coronary disease and continued to care for cardiac patients at Beth Israel Hospital. A life changing event affected Paul in 1947 when a woman directly under his care who suffered from fainting spells caused by increasingly prolonged periods of cardiac arrest, died. An autopsy revealed that her only heart abnormality was a faulty electrical system. Paul remembered what he learned practicing in the military with Harken- that the hearts of the wounded contracted from the slightest stimulus during surgery. With this in mind, Paul Zoll embarked on a mission to develop electrical methods to prevent sudden arrhythmic death.
After proving that his new discoveries were superior to established methods, he had to defend them when other techniques emerged. A sampling of controversies that engulfed Paul Zoll include his technique of closed chest resuscitation versus open chest rescue; his application of alternating current countershock versus direct current cardioversion; and his preference for open chest long-term lead placement versus transvenous lead placement.

Paul Zoll was helped by several colleagues who shared his goals and worked by his side. They were Alan Belgard, his sole engineer; surgeon Leona Norman Zarsky, who directed the animal research laboratory; Arthur Linenthal, cardiac pharmacologist and electrophysiologist; and Howard Frank, thoracic surgeon and pioneering partner in implanting long-term pacemakers.

Family, honors
In 1948 Paul Zoll and Janet Jones became parents of what Paul termed "…a pair of assorted twins…." In later years, son Ross attended Harvard College, and earned a graduate degree in physics at the University of Chicago. He then assisted Paul in the laboratory, and earned his MD degree at the University of Miami. Daughter Mary earned her Doctorate Degree in biochemistry and taught at Northeastern University in Boston and Massachusetts Institute of Technology.

During his more than 50 years of active practice and research, Paul Zoll received many awards and honors.
Janet died in 1978. Three years later, Paul married Ann Blumgart Gurewich. He retired from practice in 1993.

The descendants of Paul Zoll's discoveries continue to evolve in the forms of alarmed cardiac monitors, pacemakers, and closed chest defibrillators. These machines continue to be the platform for all modern cardiac care units. Light weight portable Automated External Defibrillators (AED) are mandated by federal and state authorities in many locations, including schools, commercial airplanes, airports, and health clubs. Since 2005 there are now wearable automatic defibrillators which need no direct medical interventions. Their presence is a constant reminder of Paul Maurice Zoll.

Death
Paul Zoll died from pneumonia on January 5, 1999.

References

External links
 

1911 births
1999 deaths
20th-century American Jews
American cardiologists
United States Army Medical Corps officers
Recipients of the Lasker-DeBakey Clinical Medical Research Award
Harvard Medical School alumni
20th-century American physicians
Boston Latin School alumni